The 2020–21 season was the 54th season in existence of Sivasspor and the club's fourth consecutive season in the top flight of Turkish football. In addition to the domestic league, Sivasspor participate in this season's editions of the Turkish Cup and the UEFA Europa League. The season covers the period from July 2020 to 30 June 2021.

Players

Current squad

Out on loan

Transfers

In

Loans in

Pre-season and friendlies

Competitions

Overview

Süper Lig

League table

Results summary

Results by round

Matches

Turkish Cup

UEFA Europa League

Group stage

The group stage draw was held on 2 October 2020.

Statistics

Goalscorers

Last updated: 11 May 2021

Clean sheets

Last updated: 11 May 2021

References

External links

Sivasspor seasons
Sivasspor
Sivasspor